Hootin' 'n Tootin' is the debut album by American saxophonist Fred Jackson, and the sole recording under his leadership, recorded in 1962 and released on the Blue Note label. The CD reissue added seven previously unissued bonus tracks from a later session.

Reception
The Allmusic review by Stephen Thomas Erlewine awarded the album 4½ stars and stated "Hootin' 'n Tootin' is a thoroughly enjoyable set of funky soul-jazz with hard bop overtones. It is true that Jackson doesn't try anything new on the set, but he proves to be a capable leader... the result is a modest but highly entertaining set of earthy, bluesy soul-jazz that should have been heard by a wider audience".

Track listing
All compositions by Fred Jackson
 "Dippin' in the Bag" – 4:01
 "Southern Exposure" – 6:56
 "Preach Brother" – 5:46
 "Hootin' 'n Tootin'" – 4:33
 "Easin' on Down" – 6:17
 "That's Where It's At" – 5:08
 "Way Down Home" – 5:11

Bonus tracks on CD reissue:
"Stretchin' Out" – 5:00
 "Mr. B.J." – 6:39
 "Egypt Land" – 4:24
 "Teena" – 5:19
 "On the Spot" – 4:55
 "Minor Exposure" – 4:58
 "Little Freddie" – 4:43

Personnel
Fred Jackson – tenor saxophone
Earl Van Dyke – organ
Willie Jones – guitar
Sam Jones – bass (tracks 8–14)
Wilbert Hogan – drums
unknown – congas and shaker (tracks 12–14)

References

Blue Note Records albums
Fred Jackson (saxophonist) albums
1962 albums
Albums produced by Alfred Lion
Albums recorded at Van Gelder Studio